Rio Preto da Eva (Black River of Eve in Portuguese) is a municipality located just east of Manaus in the Brazilian state of Amazonas.

The municipality contains most of the Biological Dynamics of Forest Fragments Project Area of Relevant Ecological Interest, created in 1985.
The municipality contains the  Rio Urubu State Forest, created in 2003.

References

Municipalities in Amazonas (Brazilian state)